Peringolam is a village situated in the west of Peruvayal panchayath in Kozhikode district, Kerala. It is located two kilometers away from NH 766. This village is surrounded by Kunnamangalam, Kuttikkatoor, Kurikkathoor and Kottamparamb. Peringolam is famous as a location for several important institutions including milma regional headquarter.

Etymology

The word Peringolam  derived from two Malayalam words  "Peru" means largest and "Kulam" means pond.

Governing Body 
Peringolam is a part of Peruvayal Gramapanchayath. It includes two wards, i.e. ward 1 and ward 2.

Educational institutions 

 Government Higher Secondary School Peringolam
 Centre for Water Resources Development and Management - CWRDM
 Kerala School of Mathematics
 Indian Institute of Management Kozhikode (IIMK)
 Anganwadi, Santhichira
 Al-Birr Pre-primary School

Industries 
 Milma [MRCMPU Ltd]
 Mercy Foods

Places of worship
 Juma' Masjid
 Sree Durga Bagavathi Kshethram
 Srambya Masjid

Cultural centres
 Njanapradhayini Library & Reading Room
 'Iqra' Library

Cultural groups
 Marhama Edu-support Programme
It is an educational service programme run by Students Islamic Organisation of India (SIO) Peringolam Unit. Marhama helps students with the distribution of study materials and scholarships.    
 Santhi Residents Association
 Pain & Paliative Care
 Lahari Virudha Samithi
It is a common platform of all local political and social groups of Peringolam against narcotic materials. It conducted a Human chain programme on 2 October 2014 at Peringolam.
Action Committee against alleged Pollution by Milma

References

Villages in Kozhikode district
Kozhikode east